Keever–Cansler Farm, also known as the Daniel Keever Farm, is a historic farm and national historic district located near Blackburn, Catawba County, North Carolina. The district encompasses 5 contributing buildings. The main house was built in 1879, and is a two-story, brick, I-house dwelling.  Also on the property are the contributing granary, frame barn (c. 1920), log barn, and smokehouse / wood shed.

It was added to the National Register of Historic Places in 1990.

References

Farms on the National Register of Historic Places in North Carolina
Historic districts on the National Register of Historic Places in North Carolina
Houses completed in 1879
Houses in Catawba County, North Carolina
National Register of Historic Places in Catawba County, North Carolina